The Central District of Fahraj County is a district (bakhsh) in Fahraj County, Kerman Province, Iran. At the 2006 Census, its population was 23,442, in 5,409 families.  The district has one city: Fahraj. The district has two rural districts (dehestan): Borj-e Akram Rural District and Fahraj Rural District.

References 

Fahraj County
Districts of Kerman Province